Papyrus Oxyrhynchus 299 (P. Oxy. 299 or P. Oxy. II 299) is a fragment of a Letter concerning a Mouse-Catcher, in Greek. It was discovered in Oxyrhynchus. The manuscript was written on papyrus in the form of a sheet. It was written in the late first century. Formerly it was held in the Bradfield College. The actual owner of the codex and place of its housing is unknown.

Description 
The measurements of the fragment are 54 by 108 mm.

The document was written by Horus to Appion about the payment of a mouse-catcher. It was published by Bernard Pyne Grenfell and Arthur Surridge Hunt in 1899.

See also 
 Oxyrhynchus Papyri

References 

299
1st-century manuscripts
Lost documents